Polawat Wangkahart (born July 27, 1987) is a Thai professional footballer who plays as a right back for Thai League 2 club Phrae United.

International career

In September, 2010 he debut for Thailand in a friendly match against India.

International

Honours

Club
Osotspa Saraburi
 Kor Royal Cup (1): 2007

 Lamphun Warriors
 Thai League 2 (1): 2021–22

References

External links
 

1987 births
Living people
Polawat Wangkahart
Polawat Wangkahart
Association football fullbacks
Polawat Wangkahart
Polawat Wangkahart
Polawat Wangkahart
Polawat Wangkahart
Polawat Wangkahart
Polawat Wangkahart
Polawat Wangkahart
Polawat Wangkahart
Polawat Wangkahart
Polawat Wangkahart
Footballers at the 2010 Asian Games
Polawat Wangkahart